Khammam Assembly constituency is a constituency of Telangana Legislative Assembly, India. It is one of 10 constituencies in Khammam district. It includes the city of Khammam  and part of Khammam Lok Sabha constituency.

Puvvada Ajay Kumar of Telangana Rashtra Samithi won the seat for the second time in Assembly elections held 7 December 2018.

Extent of the Constituency
The Assembly Constituency presently comprises the following :

MLAs

Election results

Telangana Legislative Assembly election, 2018

Telangana Legislative Assembly election, 2014

See also
 List of constituencies of Telangana Legislative Assembly

References

Assembly constituencies of Telangana
Khammam district